Robby Ndefe (born 1 September 1996) is a Dutch-Angolan professional footballer player who plays for Belgian Division 2 club Olsa Brakel.

Club career
He made his professional debut in the Eerste Divisie for RKC Waalwijk on 30 October 2016 in a game against Fortuna Sittard.

On 26 August 2019, Ninove announced, that they had signed Ndefe.

On 1 July 2021, Ndefe signed with Belgian Division 2 club Olsa Brakel.

References

External links
 

1996 births
Living people
Dutch people of Angolan descent
Dutch footballers
RKC Waalwijk players
Eerste Divisie players
Association football forwards
Sportspeople from Weert
Dutch expatriate footballers
Expatriate footballers in Belgium
Dutch expatriate sportspeople in Belgium
Footballers from Limburg (Netherlands)
K.V.K. Ninove players